Automatic layout is an option in graph drawing toolkits that allow to lay out the Graph according to specific rules, such as:
	 
reducing the length of the arcs between the Graph vertices

reduce the number of edges crossing (to improve the graph readability)

See also
Methods in graph drawing

Graph drawing